The drug combination alfatradiol/dexamethasone (trade name Ell-Cranell dexa in Germany) is used topically for the treatment of mild to moderate androgenic alopecia (hair loss) in younger women.

References

Combination drugs
Embryotoxicants